The Vickers Aircraft Company Wave is a two-seat amphibious aircraft,  under development by the Vickers Aircraft Company of Hamilton, New Zealand. It was introduced at the Sport Aviation Expo in Sebring, Florida in 2014.

Design and development
The Wave is a two-seat, side-by-side configuration, high wing amphibious aircraft. The fuselage and wings are constructed from a combination of aluminum and carbon fibre composite materials. An automatic folding wing mechanism and ballistic parachute are planned to be integrated.

Paul Vickers, CEO of Vickers Aircraft Company LTD, has indicated that the company's approach to the development of the Wave has been intentionally non-traditional, and involves simultaneous product and manufacturing development. In April 2020, eleven years after initiation of development of the aircraft, Paul Vickers wrote that "The WAVE will be ready soon, but not before it is. It has taken the time that has been necessary to design and produce a truly incredible aircraft." The first flight of the prototype aircraft took place on March 12 2022 "

The powerplant chosen for the Wave in September 2015 was the  Continental Titan 340 four-stroke engine, mounted in a pusher configuration. In late 2019, Vickers announced a switch to the  Rotax 915iS four-stroke turbocharged engine, in the same configuration.

The aircraft is intended for the US light-sport aircraft category.

Specifications (Wave)

See also

References

Amphibious aircraft
New Zealand design
Aircraft manufactured in New Zealand
Vehicles introduced in 2014